Atika Wahbi al-Khazraji (1924–1997) was an Iraqi poet and educator.

She was born in Baghdad and began publishing poetry at the age of fourteen. al-Khazraji received a BA from the Higher Teachers' Institute, going on to work as a teacher. In 1950, she enrolled in the Sorbonne, receiving a PhD in 1955. She published a collection of the poet Abbas Ibn al-Ahnaf's work in 1954. She later taught Arabic at the Higher Teachers' Institute. She published a work on the poet Isma'il Sabri.

Selected works 

 Majnun Layla (Crazy for Layla) (1954)
 Anfas al-sihr (Breaths of magic) (1963)
 La'la' alqamar (The moon shimmered) (1965)
 Afwaf al-zahr (The flower's membranes) (1975)

References 

1924 births
1997 deaths
20th-century Iraqi poets
Iraqi women poets
People from Baghdad
20th-century Iraqi women writers
20th-century Iraqi writers
University of Paris alumni
Iraqi expatriates in France